Saint Hilary School is a private Roman Catholic school offering preschool, elementary, middle school and junior high education in Chicago, Illinois. It is located in the Roman Catholic Archdiocese of Chicago.

St. Hilary School is a Catholic, culturally diverse school located on the north side of Chicago, Illinois, at the intersection of the Budlong Woods, Arcadia Terrace, West Ridge and Lincolnwood neighborhoods.

History
The St. Hilary parish plant is situated in the heart of Budlong Woods. The area bounded by Western on the East, Peterson Avenue on the North, the North Branch of the Chicago River on the West, and Foster Avenue on the South, was originally the wooded area of the Budlong brother’s farm. The Budlong brothers developed their farm into one of the largest truck garden farms in the Chicago area. The farm gained its fame as the home of the Budlong Pickle Company. With the spread of the city, the farm was sold. A golf course was started in 1921, but it soon gave way to land developers.

Mr. and Mrs. Frank Annen, who moved into the Budlong Woods subdivision in 1919, found that they were part of St. Ita’s parish. At that time, they had to take a streetcar, with three transfers to attend Mass on Sunday. In the next 7 years, 200 families were living in the area, and after many requests, the announcement was made that a new parish would be established – consisting of Arcadia Terrace, Peterson Woods, and Budlong Woods.

On the first Sunday of May 1926, the first Mass for St. Hilary Parish was celebrated with about 150 people in attendance. The church was a portable structure, procured from St. Timothy’s parish, and was located on Lincoln Avenue between California and Fairfield. So began the life of the Archdiocese of Chicago’s 245th parish.

In April 1928, with a budget of $185,000, the construction of a building, which would serve as a school and a temporary church, was begun. On November 12, 1928, a hundred and thirty two students were admitted to St. Hilary School. The Benedictine Sisters of St. Scholastica taught them. There were three nuns teaching and one nun as principal. In 1931 St. Hilary Parish School sent forth its first graduating class of ten boys and ten girls. The original school housed both the students, during the day hours, and the nuns, who occupied the second floor of the school building. In 1934, the school became to small for increased enrollment. The twelve rooms in the building were all needed for classrooms. During the next six years, a new convent and rectory were built.

During the 1950s the pastor began acquisition of land on Bryn Mawr Avenue. With cooperation of the City of Chicago, the “alley” parallel to Bryn Mawr Avenue was also acquired. The pastor convinced the parishioners that a separate church building could be a reality. Within five years from ground breaking, the new church was debt free. Approximately $750,000 was given by the people of St. Hilary Parish, the total construction costs of their new church. On April 21, 1956, the last Mass was said in what was referred to as the “old church” (now the gym). The first Mass in the new church was said 30 years and one week after the First Mass was offered in the portable chapel on Lincoln Avenue. Cardinal Samuel Stritch dedicated the new church on June 10, 1956.

Co-Curricular Activities

General
Saint Hilary School offers students the opportunity to participate in sports, band, choir, art studio, battle of the books, science club, photography club, and yearbook club.

Athletics
The following sports are offered for St. Hilary School students: Basketball, Football, Golf, and Volleyball.

Music
St. Hilary provides instruction in regular music classes, band, choir, ukulele club, and CODAs.

References

Educational institutions established in 1928
Private elementary schools in Chicago
Private middle schools in Chicago
Catholic elementary schools in Illinois
1928 establishments in Illinois